Jin Long may refer to:

Jin Long (cyclist), (born 1983), Chinese cyclist
Jin Long (snooker player), (born 1981), Chinese snooker player